Southwark constituency may refer to various constituencies associated with the area of Southwark in London:

 Bermondsey and Old Southwark (UK Parliament constituency) (from 2010)
 Lambeth and Southwark (London Assembly constituency) (from 2010)
 North Southwark and Bermondsey (UK Parliament constituency) (19972010)
 Southwark (UK Parliament constituency) (12951885; 19501974)
 Southwark and Bermondsey (UK Parliament constituency) (19831997)
 Southwark Central (London County Council constituency)  (19191949)
 Southwark Central (UK Parliament constituency) (19181950)
 Southwark North (London County Council constituency) (19191949)
 Southwark North (UK Parliament constituency) (19181950)
 Southwark South East (London County Council constituency) (19191949)
 Southwark South East (UK Parliament constituency) (19181950)
 Southwark West (UK Parliament constituency) (18851918)